Ruden is a town in the district of Völkermarkt in the Austrian state of Carinthia.

Geography
Ruden lies in the eastern Jaun valley north of the Drau between the Wallersberg, the Lisnaberg and the Weißenegger Berg. Ruden is a popular stop for many people due to its natural wonders and people. One of its sights is the Lipitzbacher Bridge. Another place worth a visite is the Museum am Bach which is located near Lippitzbach.

Gallery

References

Cities and towns in Völkermarkt District